Ruppert Stadium may refer to: 

Ruppert Stadium (Newark) in Newark, New Jersey
Municipal Stadium (Kansas City, Missouri)